Bacchelli is an Italian surname. Notable people with the surname include:

 Fulvio Bacchelli (born 1951), former Italian rally driver
 Riccardo Bacchelli (1981 – 2020), Italian writer

See also 
 Bacchelli (singer)
 Vacchelli

Italian-language surnames